Mary Rose McGee (August 17, 1917 – March 5, 2004) was an American politician from New York.  She was the first woman elected to the New York State Assembly from Long Island.

Life
She was born Mary Rose Grasher on August 17, 1917 in Kansas City, Missouri. She moved to Bayside, Queens early in her life and moved to Huntington, Suffolk County, New York, in 1949. She married Francis Patrick McGee, had three children, and later got divorced.

Mary Rose McGee entered politics as a Democrat, and was Town Clerk of Huntington from 1967 to 1976. She was a member of the New York State Assembly in 1977 and 1978. In November 1978, she ran for re-election, but was defeated by Republican Toni Rettaliata.

Mary Rose McGee died on March 5, 2004.  A commemorative plaque honoring her achievements stands outside of the employee picnic area at the Huntington Town Hall.

References

1917 births
2004 deaths
People from Huntington, New York
Democratic Party members of the New York State Assembly
Women state legislators in New York (state)
Politicians from Kansas City, Missouri
20th-century American politicians
20th-century American women politicians
21st-century American women